Monogamy is a 2010 film directed and co-written by Dana Adam Shapiro. It is about the strained relationship of an engaged Brooklyn couple, Theo (Chris Messina) and Nat (Rashida Jones).

Synopsis
Theo is bored with his job as a wedding photographer—the generic backgrounds, the artificial posing, the stilted newlyweds—so he develops an unconventional side business, called "Gumshoot," a service where clients hire him to stalk them with his camera. Becoming infatuated with one of his clients, a mystery woman who goes by the name Subgirl (Meital Dohan), Theo develops a voyeuristic obsession that forces him to confront uncomfortable truths about himself and his impending marriage with Nat.

Production notes
Monogamy premiered April 24, 2010 at the Tribeca Film Festival.

References

External links
 
 
 
 
 Tribeca Film Festival
 Monogamy Blog

Films set in Brooklyn
2010 films
2010s English-language films